Satar is a village in Deoghar district of Jharkhand state of India.

References

Villages in Deoghar district